CBFX-FM (100.7 MHz) is a public non-commercial radio station in Montreal, Quebec. It is the flagship station of the Ici Musique Network and broadcasts in French.

Owned and operated by the government-owned Canadian Broadcasting Corporation (French: Société Radio-Canada), CBFX-FM is a Class C1 station. It transmits from the Mount Royal candelabra tower with an effective radiated power of 100,000 watts. Its studios and offices, along with those of Ici Radio-Canada Première sister station CBF-FM, are located at Maison Radio-Canada on René Lévesque Boulevard.

History
On March 13, 1946, the station began experimental broadcasts as VE9CB on 98.1 MHz. It received a full license on March 5, 1948, as CBF-FM, broadcasting at 95.1 MHz. For most of its early years, it simulcast co-owned CBF. Occasionally in the 1960s and 70s, it would break away from its AM counterpart to air special programming.

With the CBC's English-language FM network already established since the 1960s, plans were made to create a French-language FM network, with CBF-FM as its originating station. In 1971, in preparation for its role as the French FM flagship, CBF-FM swapped frequencies with CBM-FM. CBF-FM moved to 100.7, just vacated by CBM-FM, while that station moved to a new frequency, 93.5 MHz. The move not only allowed CBF-FM to boost its signal to a full 100,000 watts, but it also began to broadcast in stereo for the first time.

In 1972, La Chaîne Culturelle (The Cultural Network) was launched on four CBC-owned FM stations, CBF-FM in Montreal, CBOF-FM in Ottawa, CBV-FM in Quebec City and CBJ-FM in Chicoutimi. The network aired mostly classical music with some jazz and other arts programming.

In 1998, CBF-FM changed its call sign. Its AM sister station, CBF, moved to the FM band and picked up the CBF-FM call letters. That required the former CBF-FM to switch to a new call sign, CBFX-FM.

In 2004, the network was renamed Espace Musique. And in 2014, it became Ici Musique, still with 100.7 CBFX-FM as its originating station.

Transmitters

1 - On April 25, 2013, the CRTC approved the CBC's application to amend the licenses of CBFX's rebroadcasters at Trois-Rivières and Sherbrooke, with both stations broadcasting at least 20 minutes of local programming each week, with the remainder programming from the Espace Musique network. The Trois-Rivières repeater at 104.3 MHz will upgrade to an average ERP of 45,400 watts, and a maximum ERP of 100,000 watts (up from 43,000 watts max ERP currently) with an effective height above average terrain of 249.7 metres. The Sherbrooke transmitter at 90.7 MHz will keep its existing parameters with an ERP of 25,000 watts (non-directional antenna with an EHAAT of 173 metres).

Though CBFX-4 and CBFX-5 are technically rebroadcasters of CBFX, on-air idents show they actually rebroadcast Ottawa's CBOX-FM.

References

External links 
 ICI Musique
 

Bfx
Bfx
Bfx
Radio stations established in 1948
1948 establishments in Quebec

fr:CBFX-FM